The 2012–13 Washington Capitals season was the franchise's 39th season in the National Hockey League (NHL). The regular season was reduced from its usual 82 games to 48 due to a lockout.

Off-season
On June 26, 2012, the Capitals announced the hiring of Adam Oates as their new head coach.

Regular season
The Capitals scored the most power-play goals in the NHL during the regular season with 47. They also had the best power-play percentage at 27.65% (47 for 170).

Schedule and results

|- style="text-align:center; background:#fcf;"
| 1 || 19 || Washington Capitals ||3–6|| Tampa Bay Lightning || – || Holtby || 0–1–0|| 0 ||19,204 ||Recap
|- style="text-align:center; background:#fcf;"
| 2 || 22 || Winnipeg Jets ||4–2|| Washington Capitals || – || Holtby || 0–2–0 || 0 ||18,506||Recap
|- style="text-align:center; background:#fcf;"
| 3 || 24 || Montreal Canadiens ||4–1|| Washington Capitals || – || Neuvirth || 0–3–0 || 0 ||18,506||Recap
|- style="text-align:center; background:#ffc;"
| 4 || 25 || Washington Capitals ||2–3|| New Jersey Devils || OT || Neuvirth || 0–3–1 || 1 || 17,625 || Recap
|- style="text-align:center; background:#cfc;"
| 5 || 27 || Buffalo Sabres ||2–3|| Washington Capitals || – || Neuvirth || 1–3–1 || 3 || 18,506 || Recap
|- style="text-align:center; background:#fcf;"
| 6 || 29 || Washington Capitals ||2–3|| Ottawa Senators || – || Neuvirth || 1–4–1 || 3 || 19,267 || Recap
|- style="text-align:center; background:#fcf;"
| 7 || 31 || Washington Capitals || 2–3 || Toronto Maple Leafs || – || Neuvirth  || 1–5–1 || 3 || 19,374  || Recap
|-

|- style="text-align:center; background:#cfc;"
| 8 || 1 || Philadelphia Flyers || 2–3 || Washington Capitals || – || Holtby  || 2–5–1 || 5 || 18,506 || Recap
|- style="text-align:center; background:#fcf;"
| 9 || 3 || Pittsburgh Penguins || 6–3 || Washington Capitals || – || Holtby || 2–6–1 || 5 || 18,506 || Recap
|- style="text-align:center; background:#fcf;"
| 10 || 5 || Toronto Maple Leafs || 3–2 || Washington Capitals || – || Neuvirth  || 2–7–1 || 5 ||18,506  || Recap
|- style="text-align:center; background:#fcf;"
| 11 || 7 || Washington Capitals || 2–5 || Pittsburgh Penguins || – || Holtby || 2–8–1 || 5 ||18,650 || Recap
|- style="text-align:center; background:#cfc;"
| 12 || 9 || Florida Panthers || 0–5 || Washington Capitals || – || Holtby || 3–8–1 || 7 ||18,506 || Recap
|- style="text-align:center; background:#cfc;"
| 13 || 12 || Washington Capitals || 6–5 || Florida Panthers || OT || Holtby || 4–8–1 || 9 || 15,340 || Recap
|- style="text-align:center; background:#cfc;"
| 14 || 14 || Washington Capitals || 4–3 || Tampa Bay Lightning || – || Holtby || 5–8–1 || 11 || 19,204 || Recap
|- style="text-align:center; background:#fcf;"
| 15 || 17 || Washington Capitals || 1–2 || New York Rangers || – || Holtby || 5–9–1 || 11 || 17,200 || Recap
|- style="text-align:center; background:#fcf;"
| 16 || 21 || New Jersey Devils || 3–2 || Washington Capitals || – || Holtby || 5–10–1 || 11 || 18,506 || Recap
|- style="text-align:center; background:#cfc;"
| 17 || 23 || New Jersey Devils || 1–5 || Washington Capitals || – || Holtby || 6–10–1 || 13 || 18,506 || Recap
|- style="text-align:center; background:#cfc;"
| 18 || 26 || Carolina Hurricanes || 0–3 || Washington Capitals || – || Holtby || 7–10–1 || 15  || 18,506 || Recap
|- style="text-align:center; background:#fcf;"
| 19 || 27 || Washington Capitals || 1–4 || Philadelphia Flyers || – || Holtby || 7–11–1 || 15 || 19,904 || Recap
|-

|- style="text-align:center; background:#cfc;"
| 20 || 2 || Washington Capitals || 3–0 || Winnipeg Jets || – || Holtby || 8–11–1 || 17  || 15,004 || Recap
|- style="text-align:center; background:#cfc;"
| 21 || 5 || Boston Bruins || 3–4 || Washington Capitals || OT || Holtby || 9–11–1 || 19  || 18,506 || Recap
|- style="text-align:center; background:#cfc;"
| 22 || 7 || Florida Panthers || 1–7 || Washington Capitals || – || Holtby || 10–11–1 || 21 || 18,506 || Recap
|- style="text-align:center; background:#fcf;"
| 23 || 9 || Washington Capitals || 2–5 || New York Islanders || – || Grubauer || 10–12–1 || 21 || 14,819 || Recap
|- style="text-align:center; background:#fcf;"
| 24 || 10 || New York Rangers || 4–1 || Washington Capitals || – || Holtby || 10–13–1 || 21 || 18,506 || Recap
|- style="text-align:center; background:#fcf;"
| 25 || 12 || Carolina Hurricanes || 4–0 || Washington Capitals || – || Holtby || 10–14–1 || 21 || 18,506 || Recap
|- style="text-align:center; background:#cfc;"
| 26 || 14 || Washington Capitals || 3–2 || Carolina Hurricanes || – || Neuvirth || 11–14–1 || 23 || 16,810 || Recap
|- style="text-align:center; background:#fcf;"
| 27 || 16 || Washington Capitals || 1–4 || Boston Bruins || – || Neuvirth || 11–15–1 || 23 || 17,565 || Recap
|- style="text-align:center; background:#cfc;"
| 28 || 17 || Buffalo Sabres || 3–5 || Washington Capitals || – || Holtby || 12–15–1 || 25 || 18,506 || Recap
|- style="text-align:center; background:#fcf;"
| 29 || 19 || Washington Capitals || 1–2 || Pittsburgh Penguins || – || Holtby || 12–16–1 || 25 || 18653 || Recap
|- style="text-align:center; background:#cfc;"
| 30 || 21 || Washington Capitals || 4–0 || Winnipeg Jets || – || Holtby || 13–16–1 || 27 || 15,004 || Recap
|- style="text-align:center; background:#cfc;"
| 31 || 22 || Washington Capitals || 6–1 || Winnipeg Jets || – || Holtby || 14–16–1 || 29 || 15,004 || Recap
|- style="text-align:center; background:#cfc;"
| 32 || 24 || Washington Capitals || 3–2 || New York Rangers || SO || Holtby || 15–16–1 ||  31 || 17,200 || Recap
|- style="text-align:center; background:#fcf;"
| 33 || 26 || New York Islanders || 3–2 || Washington Capitals || – || Holtby || 15–17–1 || 31 || 18,506 || Recap
|- style="text-align:center; background:#cfc;"
| 34 || 30 || Washington Capitals || 4–3 || Buffalo Sabres || SO || Holtby || 16–17–1 || 33 || 19,070 || Recap
|- style="text-align:center; background:#ffc;"
| 35 || 31 || Washington Capitals || 4–5 || Philadelphia Flyers || OT || Holtby || 16–17–2 || 34 || 19,681 || Recap
|-

|- style="text-align:center; background:#cfc;"
| 36 || 2 || Washington Capitals || 5–3 || Carolina Hurricanes || – || Holtby || 17–17–2 || 36 || 16,530 || Recap
|- style="text-align:center; background:#cfc;"
| 37 || 4 || New York Islanders || 1–2 || Washington Capitals || SO || Holtby || 18–17–2 || 38 || 18,506 || Recap
|- style="text-align:center; background:#cfc;"
| 38 || 6 || Washington Capitals || 4–3 || Florida Panthers || – || Holtby || 19–17–2 || 40 || 16,886 || Recap
|- style="text-align:center; background:#cfc;"
| 39 || 7 || Tampa Bay Lightning || 2–4 || Washington Capitals || – || Neuvirth || 20–17–2 || 42 || 18,506 || Recap
|- style="text-align:center; background:#cfc;"
| 40 || 9 || Washington Capitals || 3–2 || Montreal Canadiens || – || Neuvirth || 21–17–2 || 44 || 21,273 || Recap
|- style="text-align:center; background:#cfc;"
| 41 || 11 || Carolina Hurricanes || 1–3 || Washington Capitals || – || Holtby || 22–17–2 || 46 || 18,506 || Recap
|- style="text-align:center; background:#cfc;"
| 42 || 13 || Tampa Bay Lightning || 5–6 || Washington Capitals || OT || Holtby || 23–17–2 || 48 || 18,506 || Recap
|- style="text-align:center; background:#cfc;"
| 43 || 16 || Toronto Maple Leafs || 1–5 || Washington Capitals || – || Holtby || 24–17–2 || 50 || 18,506 || Recap
|- style="text-align:center; background:#fcf;"
| 44 || 18 || Washington Capitals || 1–3 || Ottawa Senators || – || Holtby || 24–18–2 || 50 || 19,965 || Recap
|- style="text-align:center; background:#cfc;"
| 45 || 20 || Washington Capitals || 5–1 || Montreal Canadiens || – || Holtby || 25–18–2 || 52 || 21,273 || Recap
|- style="text-align:center; background:#cfc;"
| 46 || 23 || Winnipeg Jets || 5–3 || Washington Capitals || – || Holtby || 26–18–2 || 54 || 18,506 || Recap
|- style="text-align:center; background:#ffc;"
| 47 || 25 || Ottawa Senators || 2–1 || Washington Capitals || OT || Neuvirth || 26–18–3 || 55 || 18,506 || Recap
|- style="text-align:center; background:#cfc;"
| 48 || 27 || Boston Bruins || 2–3 || Washington Capitals || OT || Holtby || 27–18–3 || 57 || 18,506 || Recap
|-

|- style="text-align:center;"
| Legend:       = Win       = Loss       = OT/SO Loss

Season standings

Playoffs

The Washington Capitals ended the 2012–13 regular season as the Southeast Division champions and therefore as the Eastern Conference's 3rd seed. They faced the #6 seed New York Rangers in the first round, losing 4 games to 3.

Key:  Win  Loss

|- style="text-align:center; background:#cfc;"
| 1 || May 2 || New York Rangers ||1–3|| Washington Capitals || – || Holtby || Capitals lead 1–0 || 18,506 ||Recap
|- style="text-align:center; background:#cfc;"
| 2 || May 4 || New York Rangers ||0–1|| Washington Capitals || OT || Holtby || Capitals lead 2–0 || 18,506 ||Recap
|- style="text-align:center; background:#fbb;"
| 3 || May 6 || Washington Capitals ||3–4|| New York Rangers || – || Holtby || Capitals lead 2–1 || 17,200 || Recap
|- style="text-align:center; background:#fbb;"
| 4 || May 8 || Washington Capitals ||3–4|| New York Rangers || – || Holtby || Series ties 2–2 || 17,200 || Recap
|- style="text-align:center; background:#cfc;"
| 5 || May 10 || New York Rangers ||1–2|| Washington Capitals || OT || Holtby || Capitals lead 3–2 || 18,506 || Recap
|- style="text-align:center; background:#fbb;"
| 6 || May 12 || Washington Capitals ||0–1|| New York Rangers || – || Holtby || Series tied 3–3 || 17,200 || Recap
|- style="text-align:center; background:#fbb;"
| 7 || May 13 || New York Rangers ||5–0|| Washington Capitals || – || Holtby || Rangers win 4–3 || 18,506 || Recap
|-

Player statistics
Final stats
Skaters

Goaltenders

†Denotes player spent time with another team before joining the Capitals.  Stats reflect time with the Capitals only.
‡Traded mid-season
Bold/italics denotes franchise record

Awards and records

Awards

Transactions
The Capitals have been involved in the following transactions during the 2012–13 season.

Trades

Free agents signed

Free agents lost

Claimed via waivers

Lost via waivers

Player signings

Draft picks

Washington Capitals' picks at the 2012 NHL Entry Draft, held in Pittsburgh, Pennsylvania on June 22 & 23, 2012.

Draft notes
 The Colorado Avalanche first-round pick went to the Washington Capitals as a result of a July 1, 2011, trade that sent Semyon Varlamov to the Avalanche in exchange for 2012 second-round pick and this pick.
 The Washington Capitals second-round pick went to the New Jersey Devils as the result of a February 28, 2011, trade that sent Jason Arnott to the Capitals in exchange for Dave Steckel and this pick.
 The Winnipeg Jets fourth-round pick went to the Washington Capitals as a result of a July 8, 2011, trade that sent Eric Fehr to the Jets in exchange for Danick Paquette and this pick.
 The Calgary Flames seventh-round pick went to the Washington Capitals as a result of a July 17, 2009, trade that sent Keith Seabrook to the Flames in exchange for this pick.
 The Pittsburgh Penguins seventh-round pick went to the Washington Capitals as a result of a June 4, 2012, trade that sent Tomas Vokoun to the Penguins in exchange for this pick.

See also 
 2012–13 NHL season

References

Washington Capitals seasons
W
W
Washington Capitals
Washington Capitals